Chakrayapalem is a village in Guntur district of the Indian state of Andhra Pradesh. It is located in Kollipara mandal of Tenali revenue division. The village contains around 3000 population and is very near to Tenali (7 km). The main occupation of the people is farming.

References 

Villages in Guntur district